Lintneria smithi is a species of moth in the family Sphingidae, the sphinx moths and hawk moths. It is known by the common name Smith's sphinx. It is known from southern Arizona, southeastern New Mexico, and Sonora in northwestern Mexico.

This moth has a thick, elongated body and a wingspan of about 9 centimeters. The larva is mottled white and grayish brown with a purple tinge. It is similar in pattern to Lintneria xantus, but structurally more similar to Lintneria lugens. It is smaller than both, with a shorter, more rounded forewing.

This moth has only been recorded at three or four locations. Little is known about its life history.

References

Lintneria
Moths described in 1998
Natural history of Arizona
Natural history of Sonora